"Zuko Alone" is the seventh episode of the second season of the American animated Nickelodeon television series Avatar: The Last Airbender. Written by Elizabeth Welch and directed by Lauren MacMullan, it aired in the United States on May 12, 2006. The only episode in the series to not feature Zach Tyler Eisen as Aang, it follows Zuko as he comes across an Earth Kingdom village and meets a family whose eldest son is in the war. The episode also contains flashbacks to five years prior to the series’ start showing how Zuko's father, Ozai, became Firelord.

The episode received critical acclaim and is regarded as one of the best episodes from Avatar: The Last Airbender.

Plot 
Zuko, after travelling alone for many days, comes across an Earth Kingdom village where the soldiers meant to be protecting the people are instead behaving like criminals. After Zuko takes the fall for a young boy named Lee, who threw an egg at the soldiers, Lee invites Zuko to his farm for dinner. Zuko learns from Lee's parents that their eldest son, Sensu, is currently fighting in the war. That night, Lee tries to take Zuko's dual swords to practice with them. Zuko catches him and instead teaches him how to use them.

Five years earlier, Zuko and his mother Ursa receive a letter from Iroh stating that he has broken through the Outer Wall of Ba Sing Se. Alongside the letter, Iroh gifts Zuko an Earth Kingdom knife and Zuko's sister Azula an Earth Kingdom doll, which she sets ablaze. Azula points out to Zuko and Ursa that if Iroh dies, their father Ozai will become Firelord. The next morning, Ursa tells the two children that Iroh's son, Lu Ten, did not survive the siege. This is intercut with Lee learning from the Earth Kingdom soldiers that Sensu has been captured in the war in the present. Zuko gives Lee his knife and departs.

Lu Ten's death caused Iroh to abandon the siege and return home. Zuko and his family meet with Firelord Azulon, and Ozai presents his case to his father that he should be the next Firelord instead of Iroh. Azulon, enraged by the proposition, orders Ozai to kill Zuko to feel the pain of losing a son.

In the present, Lee's mother seeks out Zuko's help after the Earth Kingdom soldiers took Lee for having Zuko's knife. Zuko rides back into town and faces down the soldiers using his swords. He is briefly knocked unconscious and flashes back to the night he last saw his mother: Ursa tells him to “never forget who you are,” before vanishing into the night. Zuko wakes up from his vision and uses Firebending to defeat the final soldier. He proclaims to the village that he is the son of Fire Lord Ozai and heir to the throne, causing the whole town, including Lee, to furiously turn against him.

After Ursa's disappearance, Azulon is found dead and Ozai appoints himself Fire Lord. The episode ends with Zuko, in the present, being banished from the village and riding off into the sunset while the villagers furiously glare at him.

Credits 
Dante Basco, Grey DeLisle and Mako are the only main cast members in this episode, making this the first episode is which Zach Tyler Eisen, Mae Whitman and Jack DeSena do not provide their voices as Aang, Katara and Sokka respectively. Guest actors in the episode include Jen Cohn as Ursa, Walker Edmiston as Azulon and Mark Hamill as Ozai. This is Edmiston's last role before his death in February 2007.

Lauren MacMullan directed this episode, having previously directed five episodes from Book One, “The Cave of Two Lovers” and “Avatar Day”. Elizabeth Welch wrote the episode having previously written three prior episodes.

Production 
Ursa makes her appearance in this episode and is voiced by Jen Cohn. Cohn would later return for two more episodes, those being "The Earth King" and part three of the four-part series finale. Showrunners Michael Dante DiMartino and Bryan Konietzko made sure not to include the letter ‘Z’ in Ursa's name to distinguish her and her morals and beliefs from the rest of the Fire Nation royal family who all have a ‘Z’ in their name.

The Fire Lord's throne room is also fully introduced in this episode after a glimpse of it was seen in the episode The Storm. In designing the throne room, DiMartino and Konietzko took inspiration from the facial features of a dragon. It is later revealed that dragons were the first firebenders. According to DiMartino and Konietzko, the final fight in the episode takes place at high noon, to emulate a western feeling, as most western standoffs take place around this time.

Critical reception 
Tony Ireland Mell of IGN gave this episode a rating of 9.1 out of 10 commenting: “This was a very deep episode that had many layers. The narrative was that of a prime time drama in which a boy lost must search to find himself.” Hayden Childs of The A.V. Club praised the episode, in particular the journey Zuko takes through it writing “It’s hard to talk about the realism in the magic world of the Avatar, but what ‘Zuko Alone’ exhibits is just this: realism. Zuko has always been one of the most realistic and compelling characters in Avatar, and this episode gives him meaningful backstory and a meaningful arc. It may have little to do with the main action of the show, but it has everything to do with the emotional growth of Zuko.”

In March 2022, Screen Rant placed "Zuko Alone" as the fourth best episode of the series calling the episode “a heartbreaking tale of an anti-hero who's still a likable character in Avatar, as Zuko’s issues continue to pile up.” In 2020, The Harvard Crimson ranked “Zuko Alone” as the 40th best out of the total 61 episodes, and Entertainment Weekly ranked it as it second best of the show behind the four-part series finale.

Notes

References 

Avatar: The Last Airbender
2006 American television episodes
Fiction about regicide
Patricide in fiction
Television episodes about dysfunctional families